BSAT-1a was a geostationary communications satellite designed and manufactured by Hughes (now Boeing) on the HS-376 platform. It was originally ordered and operated by the Broadcasting Satellite System Corporation (B-SAT). It was used as the main satellite to broadcast television channels for NHK and WOWOW over Japan. It had a pure Ku band payload and operated on the 110°E longitude until it was replaced, along its backup BSAT-1b, by BSAT-3a. On 3 August 2010, it was decommissioned and placed on a graveyard orbit.

Satellite description
The spacecraft was designed and manufactured by Hughes on the HS-376 satellite bus. This spin-stabilized platform had two main sections. One, the spinning section, was kept rotating at 50 rpm to maintain attitude, and a despun section that was used by the payload to maintain radio coverage. The spinning section included the Star-30BP Apogee kick motor, most of the attitude control, the power subsystem and the command and telemetry subsystems. The despun section contained the communications payload, including the antennas and transponders.

With its solar panels fully extended it spanned . Its power system generated approximately 1,200 Watts of power thanks to two cylindrical solar panels. It also had a NiH2 batteries for surviving solar eclipses. It would serve along BSAT-1b on the 110°E longitude position for the B-SAT.

Its payload was composed of a four active plus four spares Ku band transponders fed by a TWTA with an output power of 106 Watts. Its footprint covered Japan and its surrounding island.

History
Broadcasting Satellite System Corporation (B-SAT) was founded in 1993 to broadcast by satellite the analog signals of NHK and WOWOW, including analog high definition Hi-Vision channels. In June 1994, it orders two HS-376 satellite from Hughes (now Boeing), BSAT-1a and BSAT-1b.

During 1997 B-SAT completed its Kawaguchi and Kimitsu satellite control centers. At 23:08:44 UTC, 16 April 1997 the Ariane-44LP flight V-95 successfully launched BSAT-1a, along Thaicom 3, from Kourou ELA-2 launch pad. On 1 August 1997, BSAT-1b entered into commercial service.

During May 2005, B-SAT ordered BSAT-3a, the replacement satellite for BSAT-1a and BSAT-1b. It was successfully launched in August 2007, and accepted into the fleet the next month. During November, 2007 BSAT-3a took over the broadcasting of analog and digital signals from BSAT-1a and BSAT-1b. On 3 August 2010, BSAT-1a was placed in a graveyard orbit and decommissioned.

References

Communications satellites in geostationary orbit
Spacecraft launched in 1997
Satellites using the HS-376 bus